There are a number of reportedly haunted locations in Scotland.

List

A
 A fifteen-mile stretch of the A75, between Annan and Dumfries, is reported to be haunted. Drivers along the road have reported frightening apparitions that vanish just when the vehicle is about to strike them.
Abergeldie Castle
Ackergill Tower, Wick is said to be haunted by the ghost of Helen Gunn, who was abducted by John Keith for her beauty. She flung herself, or fell, from the highest tower to escape her abductor's advances. Supposedly her ghost is still seen, wearing a long red rustling ball gown and a tall head of black hair.
Airth Castle has had reported sightings of a nanny with two young children who are said to have died in a fire at the castle. The sound of children playing being heard in rooms 3, 9 and 23. People have also reported hearing cries and screams believed to be from a maid who was attacked by her master. Additionally a ghost dog, with a predilection for biting ankles, is believed to roam the hallways.
Ardrossan Castle is said to be haunted by the ghost of William Wallace, who is said to wander the ruins on stormy nights.
Ardvreck Castle is said to be haunted by two ghosts.
 Auchen Castle
 Auchentiber
 Auldearn, near Nairn, has reported sightings of the ghost of Isobel Gowdie.  She confessed to witchcraft in a 1662 witch trial.

B
 Balgonie Castle
 Ballechin House
 Ballindalloch Castle
 Barcaldine Castle
 Bedlay Castle
 Birkwood Castle
 Brims Castle
 Borthwick Castle
Braemar Castle
Brodick Castle, Arran
Brodie Castle

C
The Canongate
Canongate Tolbooth, Edinburgh
Carnegie Hall, Dunfermline
The Castle of Mey
Cawdor Castle
Charlotte Square
Claypotts Castle
Comlongon Castle
Corstorphine Old Village is said to be haunted by a White Lady.
 Cortachy Castle
 Craigcrook Castle
Craigievar Castle
Craignethan Castle
Crathes Castle
Culcreuch Castle is reputedly haunted by a number of ghosts, including a phantom harpist.
 Culzean Castle is reputed to be home to at least seven ghosts including a piper and a servant girl.
 Culloden Battlefield

D
 Dalhousie Castle
 Dalzell House is said to be haunted by three ghosts: a green lady, a white lady and a grey lady. The green lady haunts the south wing: a young boy babbled that he saw her walking out from a passage; security guards at the time when the house was empty heard noises and saw her briefly; and guard dogs bark into empty room where she walks. The white lady walks around the whole estate and a number of rumours were told about her. One story said she was a maid who jumped off the battlements in the grounds, and another said she was walled up. The grey lady was said to be a nurse from World War I when the house was used as a hospital for wounded soldiers.
 Delgatie Castle
 Dornoch Castle
Drumlanrig Castle

 Dryburgh Abbey Hotel is reportedly haunted by the Grey Lady, who drowned herself in the nearby River Tweed after the murder of her lover, a monk at the (now ruined) neighbouring Abbey.
Dunaverty Castle
Dunnottar Castle

 Dunstaffnage Castle
 Duns Castle
 Duntrune Castle

E
 Edinburgh Castle is said to be one of the most haunted places in Scotland as it is connected to the Royal Mile by a network of tunnels. Many years ago a piper was sent to explore the tunnels and was told to keep playing so his progress could be tracked. However, halfway down the Royal Mile, the music suddenly stopped and the piper was never found. It is said the piper still walks the Royal Mile and sometimes the faint sound of music can often be heard from within the castle. It is believed the castle is also haunted by a drummer who only appears when the castle is about to be attacked.
 Edinburgh Festival Theatre is said by believers to be haunted by a tall, dark stranger rumoured to be the famous illusionist Sigmund Neuberger, a.k.a. The Great Lafayette.
 Edinburgh Playhouse is said to be haunted by a ghost called Albert, a man in a grey coat who appears on level six accompanied by a chill in the air. He is variously said to have been either a stagehand who was killed in an accident or a night-watchman who committed suicide.
 The Edinburgh Vaults, also known as the Southbridge Vaults. 
 Ethie Castle

F

Castle Fraser's most famous ghost is a princess staying at the castle who was murdered while she slept in the Green Room. According to legend, her body was dragged down the stone staircase leaving a bloody trail. A stain which could not be removed even with repeated scrubbing. As a last resort the steps were covered in the wooden panelling as seen today. Over the years many residents have reported seeing her ghost throughout the castle. Visitors and staff members have heard apparitional piano music, voices and whispers have been heard in the empty hall. Witnesses have seen Lady Blanche Drummond's ghost who died in 1874. She appears in a long black gown her ghost has been seen in the castle grounds and on the staircase. The kitchen staff have reported hearing the sound of children laughing and singing, only to find that there were no children at this castle.
 Fyvie Castle is said to be haunted. A story is told that in 1920 during renovation work, a skeletal woman was discovered behind a bedroom wall. On the day her remains were laid to rest in Fyvie cemetery, the castle residents started to be plagued by strange noises and unexplained occurrences. Fearing he had offended the deceased woman, this castle's Laird had the skeleton exhumed and replaced behind the bedroom wall, at which point the haunting ceased. It is said that there is a secret room in the southwestern corner that must remain sealed, lest anyone entering meet with disaster. It is not clear if this is the same room in which the woman's skeleton was found. There is also an indelible bloody stain, two apparitions and two curses associated with this place. One of the curses has been attributed to the prophetic laird, Thomas the Rhymer.

G
 Garleton Castle
George IV Bridge
George Street, Edinburgh
 Glamis Castle
 Castle Grant

Greyfriars Kirkyard is reportedly haunted with the evil spirit of George Mackenzie. The lawyer, who earned the nickname "Bluidy Mackenzie" vigorously pursued Covenanters and tortured them. Since the 1990s the churchyard has been the site of unexplained events two days after a "vagrant" had broken into his tomb to find shelter.

H
 Hermitage Castle
 Hill House is reportedly haunted and a staff member described a tall slender figure dressed in black with a long black cape that appeared from Mr Blackie's Dressing Room. Upon entering the White Bedroom the figure vanished.
 HM Prison Castle Huntly
 Holyrood Palace is said to be haunted by Bald Agnes, the ghost of Agnes Sampson.
 Huntingtower Castle

I

Inveraray Castle is believed to be haunted by the "ghost of a harpist who was hanged in 1644 for peeping at the lady of the house". The sound of a mysterious harp playing has been reported by visitors to this castle.

J

Jedburgh Castle has been the subject of many reported paranormal occurrences. Many ghosts have been seen and there have been many reports of a ghostly piper seen standing on the battlements. Strong presences have been felt and on many occasions strange lights have been witnessed by visitors. The jail found itself highlighted in the media in 2005 when a paranormal investigation team experienced extreme poltergiest activity.

K
 Kinnaird Winetower
 Kinneil House
 Knock Castle, Isle of Skye

L
 Lauriston Castle
Leith Hall is reportedly haunted. A ghost is believed to be Laird John Leith III who was killed on Christmas Day, 1763 in Aberdeen at Archie Campbell's Tavern in the Castlegate during an alcoholic brawl in which he was shot in the head, after he reacted angrily to a fellow diner who accused him of adulterating the grain sold from this hall. The ghost of John is said to appear in great pain with a dirty white bandage over his head and covering his eyes, wearing dark green trousers and a shirt. In 1968, one guest awoke during the night to see John in highland dress, his head covered in bloody bandages, standing at the foot of the bed. Other apparitional figures have also been sighted.

 Lennox Tower

 Linlithgow Palace
 Loch Leven Castle

M
 Macduff's Castle
 Mary King's Close is a now underground close in the Old Town area of Edinburgh where legend says that plague victims were trapped by the local councilmen and left to starve to death in an attempt to stop the spread of the plague.
 Meggernie Castle
 Museum of Childhood (Edinburgh)

N
 Neidpath Castle, Peebles
Newark Castle

O
Overtoun Bridge, West Dunbartonshire

P
 Pinkie House is said to be haunted by the ghost of Alexander Seton's first wife, Lilias Drummond, sometimes accompanied by a child, as a "Green Lady". She is also said to haunt Fyvie Castle.

Q
 Queensberry House

R 
 RAF Montrose, now Montrose Air Station Heritage Centre, is said to Be haunted by the ghost of Desmond Arthur.
Rait Castle

Regent Terrace, Edinburgh

Rosslyn Chapel
 Royal Lyceum Theatre, Edinburgh

S
 St Andrews Castle
 Saltoun Hall
 Sandwood Bay, Sutherland
 Sanquhar Castle
 Shieldhill Castle, Biggar
 Stirling Castle has reports of a green lady who is said to be the ghost of one of Mary Queen of Scots servants. Mary herself has been said to be the identity of the ghost of a pink lady sighted here.
 The Scotsman Hotel, Edinburgh

T
 The Tolbooth, Aberdeen is claimed by believers to be one of the most haunted buildings in Aberdeen and has been subject to many investigations by paranormal investigation teams.

Tulloch Castle has reports of ghosts including two teen girls and a green  lady.

W
 The Witchery by the Castle, a restaurant near Edinburgh Castle, is said by believers to be haunted.

See also
:Category:Paranormal places
List of ghosts
List of reportedly haunted locations in the world

References

Bibliography
 Fifty Great Ghost Stories, edt. John Canning, Souvenir Press Ltd
 Scottish Hauntings, Grant Campbell, Piccolo Ltd.

 
Lists of places in Scotland